Dominic Thompson may refer to:
 Dominic Thompson (Shortland Street)
 Dominic Thompson (footballer)